The Devil to Pay is a 1920 American silent mystery film directed by Ernest C. Warde and starring Roy Stewart, Robert McKim and Fritzi Brunette.

Cast
 Roy Stewart as Cullen Grant 
 Robert McKim as Brent Warren 
 Fritzi Brunette as Dare Keeling 
 George Fisher as Larry Keeling 
 Evelyn Selbie as Mrs. Roan 
 Joseph J. Dowling as George Roan 
 Richard Lapan as Dick Roan 
 Mark Fenton as Dr. Jernigan 
 William Marion as Detective Potter

References

Bibliography
 Goble, Alan. The Complete Index to Literary Sources in Film. Walter de Gruyter, 1999.

External links

1920 films
1920 mystery films
American mystery films
Films directed by Ernest C. Warde
American silent feature films
1920s English-language films
Pathé Exchange films
American black-and-white films
1920s American films
Silent mystery films